Wasta or wāsita is an Arabic word that loosely translates into nepotism, 'clout' or 'who you know'. It refers to using one's connections and/or influence to get things done, including government transactions such as the quick renewal of a visa or a passport or driving license, waiving of traffic fines, and getting hired for or promoted in a job which usually would take a month.

In other words, it amounts to getting something through favoritism rather than merit, or what is informally spoken of in English as "pull" from connections (the opposite of "push"). The English word cronyism overlaps in meaning but is not precisely the same. Roughly equivalent words in other languages include sociolismo in Cuba; blat in Russia; guanxi in Chinese  and Vetternwirtschaft in German, protektzia in Israeli slang,  in Chilean Spanish. In Brazilian-Portuguese it is referred to as "pistolão", "QI" (Quem Indica, or Who Indicates), or in the slang "peixada", "Pidi Padu" in Malayalam language spoken region of India, "arka" or "destek" or "torpil" in Turkish, "plecy" in Polish, "štela" in Bosnian, "Piston" in French.

Etymology
Wasta is derived from the Modern Standard Arabic word which can mean medium, means but also personal connection used to gain something.

Furthermore, companies in the Arab world rarely have a 'no-nepotism' policy in place, so one can often find a workforce made up of friends and relatives who may or may not be qualified. This takes place in both the public and private sectors.

In many Arab countries, such as Oman, Iraq, Lebanon, Kuwait, UAE, Egypt, Saudi Arabia, Syria, and Jordan wasta affects hiring and promotion decisions. This is not restricted to Arab nationals but is also practised by expatriates who use their connections as wastas.

With respect to recruitment, there seems to be a movement away from this wasta, especially in the case of multinationals and professional firms. However, wasta is still widely used in the region.

Notes

Bibliography
 Regulation, Trust, and Cronyism in Middle Eastern Societies: The Simple Economics of 'Wasta'''. (2011) Andy H. Barnett, Bruce Yandle, George Naufal, School of Business and Management-American University of Sharjah, Department of Economics- Clemson University, School of Business and Management- American University of Sharjah.
 Hutchings, K. & Weir, D. (2006). "Guanxi and Wasta: A comparison". Thunderbird International Business Review, 48(1), 141-156
 Izraeli, D. (1997). "Business Ethics in the Middle East". Journal of Business Ethics, 16(14), 1555–1560, 
 Kocherlakota, N. R. (1996). Money is Memory''. Federal Reserve Bank of Minneapolis, Research Department Staff Report 218, 1-37

Nepotism
Arab culture
Pakistani culture
Pakistani social culture